Point is a city in Rains County, Texas, United States. The population was 820 at the 2010 census.

History
Settled circa 1880 as a flag station on a section of the Missouri–Kansas–Texas (MKT) Railroad being built from Mineola to Greenville, the name submitted for a post office was initially Rice's Point, in honor of early area settler William Rice. When that was rejected, the name Point was accepted. By 1890, the community had an estimated population of fifty, a public school, and four churches. Ten men, led by newspaperman Isaac Newton Gresham, met in Point on August 28, 1902, and signed a charter to establish the Farmers' Educational and Cooperative Union of America. The organization went national in 1905 and had a million members by 1908. In 1913, Point established the first independent school district in Rains County. The number of residents had risen to around 600 in 1914. The Great Depression severely impacted the community, leading to a rapid decline in population and the number of businesses in Point. The paving of U.S. Route 69 in the early 1940s bolstered the population to approximately 420, but that figure had again declined to 350 by the end of that decade. The MKT line was abandoned in the mid-1950s. In 1957, the Iron Bridge Dam was constructed on the Sabine River to form Lake Tawakoni. When the lake reached its fullest extent in 1960, it was only four miles from Point. Point was incorporated as a city in 1966. Development along the shores of Lake Tawakoni eventually became a separate community, East Tawakoni, which incorporated in 1967. Point's population was 419 in 1970 and slowly grew, due to a combination of tourism and its role as a local agricultural trade center. The 1990 census reported 645 residents living in the city and 792 in 2000.

Geography

Point is located at  (32.931512, –95.870957). It is situated at the junction of U.S. Route 69 and Farm Roads 47 and 514 in northwestern Rains County, approximately eight miles northwest of Emory and sixty miles east of Dallas.

Climate

The climate in this area is characterized by hot, humid summers and generally mild to cool winters.  According to the Köppen Climate Classification system, Point has a humid subtropical climate, abbreviated "Cfa" on climate maps.

Demographics

As of the 2020 United States census, there were 745 people, 342 households, and 260 families residing in the city.

Education
The City of Point is served by the Rains Independent School District.

References

Cities in Rains County, Texas
Cities in Texas